Fölkersam or Fölkersahm is the name of an aristocratic Baltic German family and may refer to:

 Adrian von Fölkersam (1914-1945), German Waffen-SS officer
 Dmitry von Fölkersam (1846-1905), Admiral in the Imperial Russian Navy